Kevin T. McDougal (born May 29, 1972) is best known as the starting quarterback for the University of Notre Dame football team who narrowly missed winning the national championship in 1993. He is currently a real estate investor in South Florida.

Professional
McDougal signed as a free agent with the Los Angeles Rams in 1994, but did not make the final roster. He played for the London Monarchs of the World League of American Football in 1995, then spent two seasons with the Canadian Football League's Winnipeg Blue Bombers. In 1998, he joined the Milwaukee Mustangs of the Arena Football League, backing up Todd Hammel for two years before becoming the starter in 2000. After setting Mustangs team records for touchdowns and yardage in 2000, he played for the XFL's Chicago Enforcers in spring 2001 before returning to the Mustangs midway through the 2001 season. He played the 2002 season with the Georgia Force before retiring.

References

1972 births
Living people
American football quarterbacks
American players of Canadian football
Canadian football quarterbacks
Chicago Enforcers players
Georgia Force players
London Monarchs players
Milwaukee Mustangs (1994–2001) players
Notre Dame Fighting Irish football players
Winnipeg Blue Bombers players
People from Pompano Beach, Florida
Players of American football from Florida
Sportspeople from Broward County, Florida
Players of Canadian football from Florida
American expatriate sportspeople in England
American expatriate players of American football